Philip Wayne Johnson (born October 24, 1944), is a former justice of the Supreme Court of Texas, serving from 2005 to 2018.

References

External links
Texas Supreme Court Profile of Justice Johnson

 

1944 births
Living people
United States Air Force personnel of the Vietnam War
People from Amarillo, Texas
People from Lubbock, Texas
Recipients of the Air Medal
Recipients of the Distinguished Flying Cross (United States)
Recipients of the Silver Star
Texas lawyers
Texas state court judges
Justices of the Texas Supreme Court
Texas Tech University School of Law alumni
Texas Republicans
United States Air Force officers
Place of birth missing (living people)
21st-century American judges
Military personnel from Texas